Nur al-Din Azhdari was an Iranian poet, physician and bureaucrat who served in the court of the Ilkhanate and Jalayirids. He is principally known for his history book Ghazan-nama, written between 1357 and 1362.

References

Sources 
 
 
 

Jalayirid-period poets
Officials of the Ilkhanate
14th-century Iranian people